Stephen Leonard may refer to:
 Stephen B. Leonard (1793–1876), U.S. Representative from New York
 Steve Leonard (born 1972), British veterinarian and television personality

See also
Sir Stephen Lennard, 2nd Baronet (1637–1709), English politician
Leonard (surname)